FRET was a free magazine which covered the pop music scene in the Netherlands.  It was published in the Dutch language. It contained interviews, reviews, a gig guide and background information about Dutch bands and artists. The magazine was available at record stores and venues in the Netherlands. It was published between 1994 and 2012. Today, each issue can be read digitally via their website. The website is offline as of August 2015.

FRET was published by the Dutch Rock & Pop Institute.

References

1994 establishments in the Netherlands
2012 disestablishments in the Netherlands
Defunct Dutch websites
Defunct magazines published in the Netherlands
Dutch-language magazines
Music magazines published in the Netherlands
Free magazines
Magazines established in 1994
Magazines disestablished in 2012
Online magazines with defunct print editions
Online music magazines published in the Netherlands